Coughran Peak is a peak rising to about  at the eastern end of Guardrail Ridge in the Kyle Hills, Ross Island. It was named by the Advisory Committee on Antarctic Names in 2000 after William A. Coughran, a long-term United States Antarctic Program support employee who made 14 deployments to South Pole Station and to McMurdo Station, including three winter-over assignments, from 1984. He was ITT/ANS South Pole Station manager, winter 1989, and National Science Foundation McMurdo Station manager, winter 2000.

References
 

Mountains of Ross Island